The men's time trial of the 2011 UCI Road World Championships cycling event took place on 21 September 2011 in Copenhagen, Denmark.

After bronze medals in both 2009 and 2010, Tony Martin won his first world championship title after setting the quickest time at each of the intermediate splits, before crossing the line in a time over a minute faster than anyone else. He caught and passed the two riders who started directly before him, David Millar and Mikhail Ignatiev, and came within 45 seconds of catching a third (Taylor Phinney). The silver medal went to Great Britain's Bradley Wiggins, with the bronze medal going to four-time world champion Fabian Cancellara, who trailed Wiggins by 4.76 seconds after making an error in the closing stages.

Route

Final classification

References

External links

Men's time trial
UCI Road World Championships – Men's time trial